Stuart's burrowing snake (Adelphicos veraepacis)  is a species of colubrid snake. It is endemic to the Guatemala, where it can be found in pine-oak and cloud forests on Sierra de las Minas, the Cuilco Mountains, Sierra de los Cuchumatanes and Sierra de Xucaneb, at elevations of 1,200–2,200 m. It is terrestrial, fossorial and mainly nocturnal. It is threatened by habitat loss from agriculture and the exportation of Chamaedaphne calyculata plants.

References

Endemic fauna of Guatemala
Adelphicos
Reptiles described in 1941
Vulnerable animals
Reptiles of Guatemala